The Bhuleshwar Temple is a Hindu temple of Shiva, situated around 45 kilometres from Pune and 10 km from Pune Solapur highway from Yawat in Maharashtra, India. The temple is situated on a hill and was built in the 8th century. There are classical carvings on the walls.  It has been declared as a protected monument.

The temple is also known for the folk-tale about it, when a bowl of sweet (pedhas) is offered to the Shiva Ling, one or more of the sweets disappear. Actor-travel writer Milind Gunaji writes about his experience with this in his book Mystical, Magical Maharashtra.

The temple also has an idol of Ganesha in female attire. It is popular as Ganeshwari
 or Lambodari or Ganeshyani. This temple is said to have been built in the 1200 century by King Krishnadevaraya.

Location and construction

According to the Hindu mythology the temple was built by Panch Pandava. Also, another temple of king Bharata is built at Bhartgaon near Bhuleshwar temple. Jirnodhar of the Bhuleshwar temple was done during the period of 1230 AD during Yadava Rulers. The fort on which the temple is situated is called the Daulatmangal fort, also at times referred to as Mangalgad. Black basalt (AA type) rock was brought to construct this temple which is different as compared to surrounding brownish color basalt which has high percentage of calcium (lime - Chuna). The fort was constructed in 1629 by Adilshahi general, Murar Jagdev Pandit who, in 1630, looted Pune. He then built the fort to keep a watch on the city. The composition of light here is an interesting phenomenon especially for artists and photographers. It is created by an aisle having ornamental scriptures on the surrounding walls of the Garbhagriha & Antarala on one side & Devkulikas-cells built for various other deities-on the other. There are many tourists who come to see these historical temples.

Surroundings
Many birds migrate here and to Narayanbet, which is fifteen kilometers from here, during summer. The spot is hence visited by many bird-watchers. There are many places to visit around Bhuleshwar Temple. Like Theur Ganapati Mandir, Ramdara Temple and Jejuri Temple.

Gallery

References  

Hindu temples in Pune district